The Coca-Cola Beverages Northeast, formerly known as Coca-Cola Bottling Company of Northern New England, is a bottler of Coca-Cola, Dr Pepper, and Canada Dry soft drinks in the New England region as well as almost the entirety of upstate New York. The Coca-Cola Company does not own an interest, as the company is 100% owned by Japan-based Kirin Brewery, who until 2018 also owned the rights to the Moxie soft drink nationwide.

History
The Coca-Cola Bottling Company of Northern New England (CCNNE) was founded in Laconia, New Hampshire in 1977. Today it operates 16 distribution centers in all six New England states, as well as upstate New York. CCNNE also bottles for Cadbury-Schweppes, Rocstar Campbells and Cornucopia. It has been a subsidiary of Kirin since 1988.

The first bottling agreement between Coca-Cola and an independent bottler was in 1899 between the company and two young attorneys from Chattanooga. After being joined by a John T. Lupton, they divided their bottling rights among territories in the States. As a result, efficiency and bottle quality improved. By 1909, Coca-Cola had almost 400 bottling operations, however; most of them were family-owned bottling plants. In October 2019 CCNNE was renamed Coca-Cola Beverages Northeast.

Products
Coca-Cola Beverages Northeast bottles and/or distributes products from The Coca-Cola Company, Dr Pepper Snapple Group, Nestlé, and Campbell's. There are over 350 varieties of flavours, sizes and packages. The product categories that CCNNE use are Sparkling soft drinks (e.g. Coca-Cola), Still beverages (e.g. Powerade) and Emerging brands (e.g. Glaceau Vitamin Water).

Sparkling soft drinks
 Coca-Cola
 Coca-Cola Zero
 Diet Coke
 Sprite (soft drink) Lemon-Lime
 Barq's Rootbeer
 Fanta Fruit Flavored Soft Drinks
 Fresca Sparkling Citrus
 Dr Pepper Spicy Cherry
 Sunkist (soft drink) Orange
 Canada Dry Ginger Ale

Still beverages
 Powerade Mountain Blast, Fruit Punch, Orange
 Bottled Waters Dasani, Evian, SmartWater
 Minute Maid Orange, Apple, Lemonade
 Tea Drinks Gold Peak Tea, Nestea

Emerging brands
 Full Throttle (drink) Original
 Glacéau Vitamin Water Power C, XXX, Revive
 Orangina
 NOS (drink) Energy Drink

Notes

External links
Official website
Annual Review of the Coca-Cola financial data
 Products of the Coca-Cola Bottling Company of Northern New England (CCNNE)

Coca-Cola bottlers
Kirin Group
Mitsubishi companies
Privately held companies of the United States
Drink companies of the United States
American subsidiaries of foreign companies